Dehradun canals refers to the heritage network of canals that was once spread across Dehradun in Uttarakhand, India, with the earliest, Rajpur Canal, dating back to early 17th century. After the city became the state capital in 2000, rapid and unchecked road-widening schemes led to the covering, or in some cases demolition, of most of the historic canals. One of the last remaining canals was covered in 2007. 

Despite public protests and advisories from environmentalists about the ecological benefit of the canals, they were covered to make room for ever-increasing traffic. Many environmental groups have campaigned for the revival of the historic network, citing its aesthetic value and positive effects on the city's urban environment and microclimate. Currently, the Government of Uttarakhand has not announced any plans of reviving or restoring the canal network.

History
The construction of the first canal, Rajpur Canal, in the early 17th century has been attributed to Rani Karnavati of Garhwal. The next phase of canal development occurred during the British Raj, when the engineer Proby Cautley expanded five canals in the 1850s.

Significance
The canals ensured natural drainage flow of the city that prevented waterlogging, which is regularly seen in the city today. They also irrigated the paddy fields where Dehradun basmati rice were grown. Because of the water streams criss-crossing the city, a cooler microclimate was produced. The canals that were demolished or covered include Kalapathar, Bijapur, Rajpur and Jakhan canals. Kalanga canal, being on the outskirts of the city, survives and parts of Bijapur canal are still visible.

References

External links
Uttarakhand Irrigation Department - Historic Canals

Dehradun
Geography of Uttarakhand
Canals in India
Buildings and structures in Uttarakhand
Buildings and structures in Dehradun
History of Uttarakhand
History of Dehradun
Tourist attractions in Dehradun